Attorney General Homburg may refer to:

Hermann Homburg (1874–1964), Attorney-General of South Australia
Robert Homburg (1848–1912), Attorney-General of South Australia